is a Japanese four-panel manga series written and illustrated by , author of Ai Mai Mi. An anime television series adaptation began airing in October 2015.

Characters
Somera Nonomoto

 or Somera-chan is a girl who can wield the mysterious and invincible "Nonomoto Mahou-ken" form of magical kenpō, which she inherited from her late mother.

Kukuru Nonomoto

 is Somera-chan's younger sister.

Shizuku Tendō

 is Somera-chan's friend and neighbor.

Ai Matsushima

 is a girl who is looking for her missing sister.

Media

Manga
Choborau Nyopomi published the Fushigi na Somera-chan manga in Ichijinsha's Manga Palette Lite magazine beginning in its 6th issue and ending in its 38th issue in April 2011, when the magazine ceased publication.  The series was compiled into two tankōbon volumes, both of which are out of print and only available on Amazon Kindle.

A sequel, titled Fushigi na Somera-chan Haute Couture, began publication in the June issue of Ichijinsha's Manga 4-koma Palette on 22 April 2015 after the announcement of the anime television prompted a number of readers to request the return of the series.  The series ended on 22 May 2018.

Volume list

Anime
An anime adaptation, directed by Itsuki Imazaki, was originally teased as an April Fools' Day joke, but Imazaki later confirmed that production had begun and he was working on storyboards for the series.  It was later revealed that the anime, a television series, would be animated by animation studio Seven and produced by Dream Creation. Imazaki was also confirmed to be writing, producing, and creating character designs for the series.  Masakatsu Oomuro serves as the show's sound director, and Fūga Hatori produces the music. Sound production for the series is provided by DAX Production.  The anime adapted material both from the original manga and the sequel.

The anime is the third installment in the "Choborau Nyopomi Theater", after the Ai Mai Mi and Choboraunyopomi Gekijō Dainimaku Ai Mai Mi: Mōsō Catastrophe television series, both of which were also directed by Imazaki.

The series began airing on 7 October 2015 on AT-X, TV Saitama, KBS, TVK, and Sun TV.  It is streamed worldwide by Crunchyroll.

Episode list

References

External links
  at Ichijinsha 
  
 

Anime series based on manga
Comedy anime and manga
Ichijinsha manga
Seinen manga
Seven (animation studio)
Yonkoma